Duck Run Cable Suspension Bridge, also known as Trubada Swinging Bridge, is a historic cable suspension bridge that spans the Little Kanawha River at Trubada, Gilmer County, West Virginia. The bridge was built in 1922.  The bridge is 351 feet, 7 inches, with a main span of 209 feet, 9 inches, and two half spans of 76 feet, 6 inches, and 65 feet, 4 inches.  It features four reinforced concrete towers for the two wire rope cables.

It was listed on the National Register of Historic Places in 1997.

References

Suspension bridges in West Virginia
Road bridges on the National Register of Historic Places in West Virginia
Bridges completed in 1922
Buildings and structures in Gilmer County, West Virginia
Transportation in Gilmer County, West Virginia
National Register of Historic Places in Gilmer County, West Virginia
Concrete bridges in the United States